Roubíček (Czech feminine: Roubíčková) is a Czech surname. Notable people with this surname include:

 George Roubicek (born 1935), Austrian actor
 Iveta Roubíčková (born 1967), Czech biathlete
 Václav Roubíček (born 1967), Czech tennis player

See also
 
 Roubík, a related surname

Czech-language surnames